Bycot was a station on the Reading Company's New Hope Branch. The line on which the station was located is now the New Hope and Ivyland Railroad. Bycot was the smallest staffed station on the New Hope Branch, with a small wooden platform and freight house.

References

Former Reading Company stations
Former railway stations in Bucks County, Pennsylvania
Railway stations closed in 1952
Railway stations in the United States opened in 1891